Bloodsport is a 1988 American martial arts action film directed by Newt Arnold and starring Jean-Claude Van Damme, Leah Ayres, Forest Whitaker, Donald Gibb, Roy Chiao, and Bolo Yeung. The film centers on Frank Dux (Van Damme), a United States Army Captain and ninjitsu practitioner, who competes in an underground, full-contact martial arts tournament called the Kumite in Hong Kong. It was one of Van Damme's first starring films and showcased his athletic abilities, launching his career as a mainstream action star.

The screenplay is based on many of Dux's claims first covered in the November 1980 issue of Black Belt magazine. The real Dux served as the film's action choreographer and technical advisor. After its release, many of Dux's claims were disputed, including by co-screenwriter Sheldon Lettich, who claimed Dux fabricated his fight record and the existence of the Kumite.

Bloodsport was produced by Cannon Films and released by Warner Bros. on 26 February 1988. Despite mixed reviews from critics, it was a considerable box office success, grossing $50 million on a budget of $1.5–2.3 million. It developed a strong cult following, and has been cited as an influence on the development of mixed martial arts. It spawned three direct-to-video sequels.

Plot
U.S. Army Captain Frank Dux has trained in the ways of ninjutsu under his sensei Senzo Tanaka. As a boy, Dux and a group of his friends broke into Tanaka's home to steal a katana, but Dux was apprehended while returning the katana to its place. Impressed by Dux's integrity and toughness, Senzo decided to train him alongside his son, Shingo. After Shingo's death, Senzo trains Dux as a member of the Tanaka clan. Dux is invited to the Kumite, an illegal martial arts tournament in Hong Kong. After his Army superiors refuse to let him go, Dux goes absent without leave, says goodbye to his sensei and leaves for Hong Kong. Two Criminal Investigation Command agents, Helmer and Rawlins, are assigned to track down and arrest Dux.

After arriving in Hong Kong, Dux befriends American fighter Ray Jackson and their guide Victor Lin. When they arrive at the Kumite arena, the officials are skeptical but eventually accept them after Dux proves his connection to the Tanaka clan by performing the Dim Mak death touch. On the first day of the tournament, Dux earns the enmity of the ruthless Kumite champion Chong Li after breaking his record for the fastest knockout.

Dux becomes involved with American journalist Janice Kent, who is investigating the Kumite. Although Dux refuses to help her, she sneaks into the arena by agreeing to a date with another spectator. On the second day, Jackson is matched against Chong Li. Although Jackson comes close to defeating Li, he wastes time gloating, allowing Li to recover and brutally beat him. Dux visits Jackson in the hospital and vows to avenge him. After witnessing the brutality of the tournament, Kent argues with Dux and tries to convince him not to return. Dux tells her that he has to win in order to become the best he can be.

Helmer and Rawlins arrive in Hong Kong and contact local police inspector Chen. They begin asking around for Dux and track him down to his hotel. A chase through the downtown ensues but Dux evades them when they fall into a canal. When Dux arrives at the Kumite, Helmer and Rawlins are waiting for him, along with Chen and four of his officers. Dux defeats them, but agrees to return with Helmer and Rawlins after the tournament.

On the final day, Li kills his semifinal opponent, much to the consternation of the crowd. Fearing defeat in the final match against Dux, Li conceals a salt pill in his waistband before the bout. When Dux gains the upper hand, Li blinds him by crushing the pill and throwing it into Dux's face. Dux falls back on his training from Tanaka, who taught him to fight blindfolded, overcoming the handicap and defeating Li and becoming the new Kumite Grand Champion, in the closing of the tournament he is awarded a Ceremonial Sword as the prize by the judges. The next day, he bids farewell to Kent and Jackson before returning to the United States with Helmer and Rawlins.

Cast

Production

Writing 
Co-writer Sheldon Lettich came up with the idea for the film. According to Lettich:

"I had known Frank Dux for a number of months before I came up with the idea for Bloodsport. Frank told me a lot of tall tales, most of which turned out to be bullshit. But his stories about participating in this so-called "Kumite" event sounded like a great idea for a movie. There was one guy who he introduced me to, named Richard Bender, who claimed to have actually been at the Kumite event and who swore everything Frank told me was true. A few years later this guy had a falling-out with Frank, and confessed to me that everything he told me about the Kumite was a lie; Frank had coached him in what to say."

Producer Mark Di Salle said he was looking for "a new martial arts star who was a ladies' man, [but Van Damme] appeals to both men and women. He's an American hero who fights for justice the American way and kicks the stuffing out of the bad guys."

Filming 
Bloodsport was entirely filmed on-location in Hong Kong. It is one of the few films featuring scenes filmed inside Kowloon Walled City before its demolition in 1993. Other locations included The Peninsula Hotel, Causeway Bay, Hong Kong Trail, Victoria Peak, and Stanley Fort.

Soundtrack

Bloodsports soundtrack score was composed by Paul Hertzog, who also composed another Jean-Claude Van Damme film, Kickboxer. The soundtrack contains the songs "Fight to Survive" and "On My Own", both performed by Stan Bush. Bush's songs are replaced on the soundtrack with alternate versions sung by Paul Delph, who was nominated for a Grammy for this work. The film plays the song "Steal the Night" by Michael Bishop during a scene where Dux runs from Helmer and Rawlins. The song was released in the mid-2000s as a single containing a vocal and instrumental version. On June 26, 2007, Perseverance Records released a limited-edition CD of the soundtrack including, for the first time, the original film versions of the Stan Bush songs.

Release

Home media
Bloodsport was released on VHS, selling 150,000 units by 1989. Warner Brothers released a DVD of the film in the United States on October 1, 2002.

Reception

Box office
In January 1989, the Los Angeles Times reported a U.S. box office gross of $11.7 million against a budget of $2.3 million. In August 1989, the Chicago Tribune reported that the film pulled in $50 million worldwide, including $15 million in the U.S. and Canada, making it Cannon Group's most profitable film of 1988.

Critical response
Leonard Klady of the Los Angeles Times wrote, "Hacking through the jungle of cliche and reservoir of bad acting in Bloodsport [...] are some pretty exciting matches."

Van Damme was nominated for a Golden Raspberry Award for Worst New Star, but lost to Ronald McDonald in Mac and Me.

Rotten Tomatoes, a review aggregator, reports a 46% approval rating based on 28 reviews, with an average rating of 5.1/10. The site's consensus reads: "This is where it all began for the Muscles from Brussels, but beyond Van Damme's athleticism, Bloodsport is a clichéd, virtually plotless exercise in action movie recycling." On Metacritic the film has a weighted average score of 29 out of 100, based on 5 critics, indicating "generally unfavorable reviews".

Sequels and possible remake

Since its release, Bloodsport has become a cult film. It was followed by three direct-to-video sequels: Bloodsport II: The Next Kumite (1996), Bloodsport III (1997) and Bloodsport 4: The Dark Kumite (1999). Jean-Claude Van Damme did not appear in any of the sequels.

A remake of Bloodsport was reported to be in planning in 2011. Phillip Noyce was attached to direct a screenplay by Robert Mark Kamen. The main character was supposed to be an American Afghanistan War veteran competing in a vale tudo tournament in Brazil. Director James McTeigue was attached to the project by 2013, and the filming was to be done in Australia and Brazil. As of 2023, the remake has not been produced.

Legacy 
Bloodsport has been credited with popularizing the concepts of full contact and mixed-style martial arts competition among mainstream audiences. Early mixed martial arts events, such as UFC 1, were sometimes compared to the film.

The "shoot-style" professional wrestling event GCW Bloodsport, promoted by mixed-martial artists Josh Barnett and Matt Riddle, is inspired by the film.

Bloodsport was an inspiration for the video game Mortal Kombat, and Johnny Cage, one of the characters, is a parody of Jean-Claude Van Damme.

References

External links
 
 
 
 

1988 films
1988 martial arts films
1980s action drama films
American action drama films
American martial arts films
Bloodsport (film series)
Films set in 1979
Films set in 1980
Films set in 1981
Films set in Hong Kong
Films shot in Hong Kong
Karate films
Martial arts tournament films
Underground fighting films
Sports fiction
Films based on newspaper and magazine articles
Warner Bros. films
Golan-Globus films
Muay Thai films
American Muay Thai films
Japan in non-Japanese culture
Films directed by Newt Arnold
Films produced by Menahem Golan
Films produced by Yoram Globus
1980s English-language films
1980s American films